Neal Eugene Walk (July 29, 1948 – October 4, 2015) was an American college and professional basketball player who was a center in the National Basketball Association (NBA) for eight seasons during the late 1960s and 1970s, playing overseas afterward.  Walk played college basketball for the University of Florida, and remains the Florida Gators' all-time rebounds leader.  The Phoenix Suns picked Walk second overall in the 1969 NBA draft, having lost the coin toss with the Milwaukee Bucks for Lew Alcindor. Walk played professionally for the Suns, the New Orleans Jazz and the New York Knicks of the NBA.

Early life 

Walk was born in Cleveland, Ohio to a Jewish family, and moved to Miami Beach, Florida, with his parents Al and Sylvia at the age of 6.  He attended Miami Beach High School, and played high school basketball for the Miami Beach Hi-Tides, starting for the first time in his senior year. His high school team made the state semifinals and due to its makeup of mostly Jewish players, it sometimes was subjected to opposing fans yelling anti-Semitic comments at them.

College career 

Walk accepted an athletic scholarship to attend the University of Florida in Gainesville, Florida, where he played for coach Tommy Bartlett's Florida Gators men's basketball team for three seasons from 1966 to 1969.  In his junior season, Walk led the NCAA with 19.8 rebounds a game and averaged 26.5 points per game. As a senior team captain, he led the Gators to the 1969 National Invitation Tournament—their first-ever post-season tournament.  When Walk graduated from Florida, he was the Gators' all-time leading scorer, and still maintains the team records for career rebounds (1,181), average points per game (20.8), and rebounds in a single game (31), among others.  His No. 41 jersey remains the only number to have been retired by the Florida basketball program.

Professional career 

Walk was drafted in the first round (second pick overall) of the 1969 NBA draft by the Phoenix Suns, after they lost a coin toss with the Milwaukee Bucks for the number one pick, which turned out to be Lew Alcindor (later known as Kareem Abdul-Jabbar). In an interview with author Charley Rosen near the end of his life, Walk commented on his perception as one of the league's great "booby prizes," saying "I never paid attention to that bullshit. How many guys would love to be the second overall pick?"

Milwaukee Bucks forward Curtis Perry, a teammate of Abdul-Jabbar's, described Walk's career high 42 point game against the Bucks on January 11, 1972, as “Talent meeting the moment, a harmonic convergence.“

He played for the Suns from 1969 to 1974, averaging a career best 20.2 points per game and 12.4 rebounds per game in the 1972–73 season.  Walk was traded to the then New Orleans Jazz, and subsequently traded to the New York Knicks, where he played for two seasons.  Afterward, he went to play in Venice, Italy, then in Israel with Hapoel Ramat Gan, playing for the team for three seasons.

Walk is the only Suns player besides Charles Barkley to average 20 points and 12 rebounds in a season.

NBA career statistics

Regular season 

|-
|style="text-align:left;"|1969–70
|style="text-align:left;"|Phoenix
| 82 || – || 17.0 || .470 || – || .640 || 5.5 || 1.0 || – || – || 8.2
|-
| style="text-align:left;"|
| style="text-align:left;"| Phoenix
| 82 ||  || 24.8 || .451 ||  || .765 || 8.2 || 1.4 || – || – || 12.9
|-
| style="text-align:left;"|
| style="text-align:left;"|Phoenix
| 81 ||  || 26.4 || .479 ||  || .744 || 8.2 || 1.9 || – || – || 15.7
|-
| style="text-align:left;"|
| style="text-align:left;"|Phoenix
| 81 ||  || 38.4 || .466 ||  || .786 || 12.4 || 3.5 || – || – || 20.2
|-
| style="text-align:left;"|
| style="text-align:left;"|Phoenix
| 82 ||  || 31.1 || .460 ||  || .791 || 10.2 || 4.0 || 0.9 || 0.7 || 16.8
|-
| style="text-align:left;" rowspan="2"| 
| style="text-align:left;"|New Orleans
| 37 ||  || 23.0 || .422 ||  || .800 || 7.1 || 2.7 || 0.8 || 0.5 || 9.9
|-
| style="text-align:left;"|New York
| 30 ||  || 9.1 || .409 ||  || .880 || 2.6 || 0.7 || 0.2 || 0.1 || 3.9
|-
| style="text-align:left;"|
| style="text-align:left;"|New York
| 82 ||  || 16.3 || .432 ||  || .798 || 4.7 || 1.5 || 0.3 || 0.3 || 7.4
|-
| style="text-align:left;"|
| style="text-align:left;"|New York
| 11 ||  || 12.3 || .491 ||  || .857 || 2.5 || 0.5 || 0.4 || 0.3 || 5.6
|- class="sortbottom"
| style="text-align:center;" colspan=2|Career 
| 568 ||  || 24.4 || .459 ||  || .758 || 7.7 || 2.1 || 0.6 || 0.4 || 12.9
|- class="sortbottom"

Playoffs 

|-
| style="text-align:left;"|1970
|style="text-align:left;"|Phoenix
|5||||12.6||.395||||.750||7.0||0.4||– || –||8.0
|-
| style="text-align:left;"|1975
|style="text-align:left;"|New York
|3||||13.0||.500||||||1.7||0.7||0.3||0.7||3.3
|-
| style="text-align:center;" colspan="2"| Career
| 8 ||  || 12.8 || .415 ||  || .750 || 5.0 || 0.5 || 0.3 || 0.7 || 6.3

Life after the NBA 
After Walk retired, he legally changed his first name to Joshua.

In 1988, while Walk was living in Phoenix, it was discovered that Walk had a benign tumor enveloping his spine.  Following surgery Walk was left in a wheelchair, from which he played wheelchair basketball for the L.A.-Phoenix Samaritans in the Southern California league of the National Wheelchair Basketball Association.  In 1990 Walk was honored at the White House by U.S. President George H. W. Bush, as the "Wheelchair Athlete of The Year."

He later worked for the Phoenix Suns in the Community Affairs department.

Walk is featured in the Miami Beach Senior High School Hall of Fame, a "Gator Great" in the University of Florida Athletic Hall of Fame, and was inducted into the National Jewish Sports Hall of Fame in 2006.

On October 4, 2015, Walk died of an unspecified blood disease.

See also 

 Florida Gators
 List of Florida Gators in the NBA
 List of select Jewish basketball players
 List of NCAA Division I men's basketball season rebounding leaders
 List of University of Florida alumni
List of University of Florida Athletic Hall of Fame members

References

External links 

 Article at jewishaz.com
 NBA Stats at databasebasketball.com

1948 births
2015 deaths
21st-century American Jews
All-American college men's basketball players
American expatriate basketball people in Israel
American expatriate basketball people in Italy
American men's basketball players
American men's wheelchair basketball players
Basketball players from Florida
Centers (basketball)
Florida Gators men's basketball players
Israeli Basketball Premier League players
Jewish American sportspeople
Jewish men's basketball players
New Orleans Jazz players
New York Knicks players
Phoenix Suns draft picks
Phoenix Suns players
Reyer Venezia players
Basketball players from Cleveland
Sportspeople from Miami Beach, Florida